South Fork is a stream in San Mateo County, California. It is a tributary of San Pedro Creek.

References

See also
List of watercourses in the San Francisco Bay Area

Rivers of San Mateo County, California
Rivers of Northern California